Conleyus defodio is a species of crab, the only species in the genus Conleyus and the family Conleyidae. It lives in rubble beds in Guam, and is named after the collector Harry T. Conley.

References

Goneplacoidea
Fauna of Guam
Monotypic decapod genera